Agent Mitchell Carson is a fictional character appearing in American comic books published by Marvel Comics.

The character was portrayed in live-action by actor Martin Donovan in the Marvel Cinematic Universe 2015 film Ant-Man.

Publication history
Created by writers Robert Kirkman and Andy Kuhn, he first appeared in Marvel Team-Up Vol. 3 #21. He was the primary antagonist in the 2006 Irredeemable Ant-Man series.

Fictional character biography
Mitch Carson was a high-ranked S.H.I.E.L.D. security agent. He killed his father when he was fifteen years old and many others after that. He had, however, never been caught for any of those crimes and managed to find employment with S.H.I.E.L.D.

Carson was part of the S.H.I.E.L.D. team that took the Iron Maniac into custody. The alternate Stark was held alongside the Life Model Decoy (LMD) of Diamondback. His body somehow adapted to the sedatives used, and he attacked the agents watching him, then activated the LMD coercing it to help.

Carson was supposed to become the wearer of the newest Ant-Man suit made for S.H.I.E.L.D. by Hank Pym. The suit was thought to be stolen, but it actually disappeared by accident when Agent Chris McCarthy tried it on. Chris was later killed during a Hydra attack on the Helicarrier, and it was then that Eric O'Grady took the suit for himself.

Carson was determined to find the suit and bring in whoever stole it. During his mission to capture the new Ant-Man, he was heavily burned in the face during a fight with him. After that, it did not take long for Carson to find out that the new Ant-Man was actually O'Grady.

Eventually, Carson used an older Ant-Man suit and managed to confront and capture O'Grady. Instead of bringing him to justice, however, Carson planned to torture him. Carson confessed his crimes but before he could kill O'Grady, Iron Man arrived and intervened. Seeing Carson in the Ant-Man suit while torturing O'Grady, Stark fought and defeated him. O'Grady lied to Stark and told him that Carson killed McCarthy and tried to steal the suit. O'Grady claimed to be on the run from Carson and trying to prevent him from getting the suit. Carson was arrested for attempted murder and stealing the Ant-Man suit.

Powers and abilities
Carson has S.H.I.E.L.D. training, specifically in firearms/explosives, espionage, intelligence gathering, and hand-to-hand combat.

He gained access to an old Ant-Man suit and used it to shrink and take out Eric O'Grady wearing more advanced G.I.Ant-Man suit.

In other media

Martin Donovan portrays Mitchell Carson in the 2015 live-action Marvel Cinematic Universe film Ant-Man. This incarnation is depicted as the head of defense at S.H.I.E.L.D. while secretly working for Hydra. When Hank Pym discovers S.H.I.E.L.D. has been trying to replicate his Pym particles, he confronts Carson, Peggy Carter, and Howard Stark. Decades later, Carson allies himself with Pym's former protege-turned-adversary, Darren Cross, who has managed to successfully replicate the Pym particles. During a confrontation among these parties in the film's final act, Carson absconds with the particles. In an alternate ending, Carson is apprehended by Scott Lang before the latter can escape with them.

References

External links
 Mitchell Carson at Marvel Wiki

Marvel Comics male supervillains
Fictional characters who can change size
Fictional characters with disfigurements
Fictional patricides
Fictional secret agents and spies
S.H.I.E.L.D. agents
Superhero film characters